Daniel Lee Swenson (February 2, 1928 - May 24, 2014) was bishop of the Episcopal Diocese of Vermont from 1987 to 1993.

Biography
Swenson was ordained deacon in 1960 and priest on June 29, 1961 in St Martin's by-the-lake, Minnetonka Beach, Minnesota. He served in multiple parishes in Minnesota. In 1986 he was elected as Coadjutor bishop of Vermont and a year later succeeded as diocesan bishop. He was consecrated on May 17, 1986, in the Chapel of St Michael the Archangel of Saint Michael's College in Winooski, Vermont. He retired in 1993. Senson died in Northfield, Minnesota on May 24, 2014. He was married to Sally Mason with whom he had three children.

External links 
Obituary
Retired Bishop Daniel L. Swenson dies

1928 births
2014 deaths
Clergy from Oklahoma City
20th-century American Episcopalians
Episcopal bishops of Vermont